The 2022 Japanese Regional Football Champions League (全国地域サッカーチャンピオンズリーグ2022) was the 46th edition of the referred annually contested cup for the best-placed teams of each of their respective Regional Leagues, and of the 2022 Shakaijin Cup. Criacao Shinjuku was the title holder, as winners of the 2021 edition of the tournament. Promoted to the JFL, the club couldn't defend their title. Briobecca Urayasu won the championship at the final round, being promoted to the Japan Football League years after relegated from it on 2017. Finishing as runners-up, Okinawa SV was also promoted to Japan's 4th division for the first time in their history.

Format
As usual, 12 teams participated in the transitional tournament for regional league teams who want to join the JFL. The 2019 format was restored, with three Shakaijin Cup teams that were not yet qualified to the Champions League via the Regional Leagues (being placed below the champions of their league), alongside the nine champions of the 2022 Japanese Regional Leagues.

It featured two stages: The first stage had the 12 teams split into 3 groups with 4 teams in each, with each group winners and the overall best runners-up being qualified to the second stage. This second, and final stage, had the 4 teams playing (again) in a round-robin format, with the winners and runners-up of the competition staying a foot apart from qualifying to the 2023 Japan Football League, pending the league's approval.  Only teams that want to join the JFL can be promoted. Unlike the previous year, where 11 of the 12 teams submitted applications to the JFL (as Mitsubishi Mizushima didn't expressed a desire to join the league), all the participating teams on this edition submitted documents indicating their intention to join the JFL.  The order of priority to join the JFL goes from the first-placed team to the last-placed team in the competition, so, the two best teams amongst those whom the JFL have approved membership can be promoted. A meeting between the JFL Board of Directors, scheduled to be held on 6 December 2022, determines whether the winners and runners-up of the competition will have its membership accepted. Its results will be published on the same day at 13:00 (JST).

Depending on the clubs that ended up as the top 3 teams in the Shakaijin Cup, a specific rank that would take the J.League 100 Year Plan club status clubs and its performances in the 2022 Regional Leagues into account would be applied to determine the final teams on this competition. However, the rank was not necessary, as out of the four semi-finalists, only BTOP Thank Kuriyama was already in the competition, as the Hokkaido League champions. The other three semi-finalists had not yet qualified to the Champions League via their Regional Leagues, then, they filled the remaining three slots left, pre-allocated to the top-placed teams of the Shakaijin Cup.

Participating teams
Returning teams from the previous season were noted in bold. Teams relegated from the previous JFL season were noted in italics.

First round
Each group had its matches played in a round-robin format. Each team played three matches in just three days, from 11 to 13 November, with one being played at each day.  The draw was conducted on 22 October 2022, streamed live by Kansai Soccer League's official YouTube channel.

Group A

Group B

Group C

Ranking of second-placed teams
The three winners of each group of the first round qualifies for the final round, alongside the best-placed team among the runners-up of each group.

Final round
The group had matches played in a round-robin format. Slightly different from the previous round, each of the four teams qualified to this stage plays three matches in a five-days span, from 23 to 27 November. The top 2 teams qualified to the 2023 Japan Football League, as before mentioned.

Top scorers

References

External links
About the Tournament (JFA)
Schedule/Result (JFA)

2022 in Japanese football